The 2010 Newfoundland and Labrador Tankard was the 2010 edition of the Newfoundland and Labrador Provincial Men's Curling Championship. It was held February 2–7 at the Bally Haly Golf & Curling Club in St. John's, Newfoundland and Labrador.

Teams

Standings

Results

February 2
Ryan 10-4 Symonds
Branton 8-6 Staples (11)
Peddigrew 6-3 Smith
Gushue 7-3 Wheeler
Gushue 8-4 Branton
Blandford 8-4 Peddigrew
Symonds 6-3 Wheeler
Smith 7-5 Ryan

February 3
Blandford 9-3 Wheeler
Smith 9-1 Symonds
Peddigrew 7-6 Ryan
Gushue 8-4 Staples
Gushue 9-2 Ryan
Blandford 7-4 Branton
Wheeler 7-6 Staples
Symonds 8-7 Peddigrew (11)

February 4
Smith 7-3 Staples
Wheeler 7-5 Peddigrew
Blandford 8-7 Gushue (11)
Ryan 9-4 Branton
Ryan 7-2 Wheeler
Gushue 8-5 Symonds
Smith 5-1 Branton
Staples 6-5 Blandford

February 5
Peddigrew 10-3 Staples
Smith 8-4 Wheeler
Blandford 6-4 Ryan
Symonds 8-3 Branton
Branton 5-3 Wheeler 
Gushue 7-1 Peddigrew
Symonds 9-2 Staples
Smith 9-7 Blandford

February 6
Symonds 9-5 Blandford
Ryan 8-3 Staples
Gushue 6-1 Smith
Peddigrew 4-1 Branton

Tie breaker
Symonds 9-3 Blandford

Playoffs

Semi-final
February 7,

Final
February 7

External links

Newfoundland And Labrador Tankard
Sport in St. John's, Newfoundland and Labrador
Curling in Newfoundland and Labrador